James Charles Haydon (March 27, 1875 – October 15, 1943) was an American film director, actor and screenwriter of the silent film era. He directed twelve films between 1914 and 1920. He also appeared in five films between 1912 and 1914. He played the Wizard in  His Majesty, the Scarecrow of Oz. He was born in Frederick, Maryland and died in Baltimore, Maryland.

Filmography

Director

Actor

References

External links

1875 births
1943 deaths
American male film actors
American male silent film actors
American male screenwriters
People from Frederick, Maryland
Film directors from Maryland
20th-century American male actors
Screenwriters from Maryland
20th-century American male writers
20th-century American screenwriters